Reece Belfield Welch (born 19 September 2003) is an English professional footballer who plays as a centre-back for Premier League club Everton.

Club career
Welch joined the Everton academy at the age of 7. In September 2020, he signed his first professional contract with the club, signing on for three years. On 3 March 2022, Welch made his professional debut as a substitute in the 2–0 FA Cup victory over Boreham Wood.

International career
Born in England, Welch is of Jamaican descent. He has played for England at various youth international levels.

References

External links

Living people
2003 births
English sportspeople of Jamaican descent
English footballers
Footballers from Huddersfield
Association football defenders
England youth international footballers
Everton F.C. players